Katja Verheyen (born 29 February 1980) is a Belgian politician active within the N-VA.

Verheyen has been a member of the Flemish Parliament since 2019. She replaced Jan Peumans who opted not to take his seat. Before her term in parliament, she served as chairwoman of the Jong N-VA chapter in Limburg.

References

Living people
1980 births
Members of the Flemish Parliament
New Flemish Alliance politicians
21st-century Belgian women politicians
21st-century Belgian politicians